The Arkansas Negro Boys' Industrial School (1927-1968) was a juvenile correctional facility for black male youth in Arkansas. A fire in 1959 at the children's dormitory killed twenty-one victims.

Prelude
The NBIS mission was to place children – who would otherwise have been sent to adult prisons – on its working cotton farm, and the first superintendent was Dr. Tandy Washington Coggs. As of March 1959, the Wrightsville school had 69 boys aged between 13 and 17. According to "Negro superintendent of the reform school" L. R. Gaines, "most of the boys in the dormitory were in for minor offenses such as hubcap stealing, or because their parents had split and there was no place for them to go." The boys lived in a 1936 Works Progress Administration building described by Time as "rickety". Governor of Arkansas Orval Faubus (perhaps best known for his role in the Little Rock school segregation fight) visited the school in January 1958, saying "They really need help. They are using some old wood stoves which should be replaced", but Faubus had in fact reduced the budget by $7,100. Graduate student Gordon D. Morgan wrote a report in which he stated, "Many boys go for days with only rags for clothes ... More than half of them wear neither socks nor underwear during [the winter] of 1955-56".

Fire
In the pre-dawn morning of March 5, 1959, a fire was set in the dormitory of the Wrightsville facility. Arthur Ray Poole, aged 16, one of two inmate "sergeants" with minor responsibility, smelled the smoke. Police never investigated to determine who or what may have caused the fire, although many claims have been made. The doors had been locked into the dormitory, and the windows covered with "heavy gauge wire mesh", making escape nearly impossible. It is noted that the equivalent school for white children did not have a protocol of locking their doors. O. F. "Charley" Meadows, a 16-year-old night sergeant, helped in breaking open one window, allowing for egress. 48 boys managed to escape, while 21 burned to death.

Aftermath
The families of the deceased said that authorities told them that 14 of the dead boys were wrapped in newspapers and deposited in an unmarked grave. The gravesite is located at Haven of Rest Cemetery in Little Rock, Arkansas. There was nothing to denote that the children buried there until 2018 when a plaque was donated to the site. On the 50th anniversary of the fire, some families of the dead held a press conference at the Arkansas State Capitol.

Segregationist Governor of Arkansas Orval Faubus asked a committee to investigate the fire. The committee concluded that the correctional facility, the State of Arkansas, and the local community held responsibility for the incident, but recommended no course of action. A Pulaski County grand jury returned no indictments, but stated:
A KTHV report said that "somehow the story faded into the backdrop of the Civil Rights Movement." Frank Lawrence, brother of one of the victims, attempted to make a documentary and brought the fire more widespread attention in the early 21st century.

The land once occupied by the unit now houses the Arkansas Department of Correction's Wrightsville Unit. For sixty years, there was no marker or memorial that indicated that the boys school existed or that the fire occurred. On April 25, 2019, a monument to the dead was unveiled at the Wrightsville Unit of the Arkansas Department of Correction.

References

Further reading

External links
Encyclopedia of Arkansas History & Culture entry

1927 establishments in Arkansas
1968 disestablishments in Arkansas
1959 disasters in the United States
1959 fires in the United States
1959 in Arkansas
African-American history of Arkansas
Buildings and structures in Jefferson County, Arkansas
Buildings and structures in Pulaski County, Arkansas
Fire disasters involving barricaded escape routes
Prisons in Arkansas
History of racism in Arkansas
History of racial segregation in the United States
History of civil rights in the United States
Juvenile detention centers in the United States